The  was an electric multiple unit (EMU) train type for Chichibu-ji express services on the Chichibu Main Line operated by the private railway operator Chichibu Railway in Japan.

History
Two 2-car trains were built in 1959 with transverse seating for use on express services. New SaHa 350 intermediate cars with aluminium bodies were added in 1966. The trains were replaced by 3000 series express EMUs and withdrawn by October 1992.

Formation
The trains were formed of two driving motor cars and an intermediate trailer car as follows.
 DeHa 300 + SaHa 350 + DeHa 300

References

Electric multiple units of Japan
Train-related introductions in 1959
Chichibu Railway
1959 in rail transport
1500 V DC multiple units of Japan